James Gill (born in the United Kingdom) is a writer and a columnist  who worked for the Times-Picayune, in New Orleans, Louisiana  before joining the staff of The Advocate. He has written books about the Mardi Gras celebration.

Gill emigrated to the United States from Great Britain in 1977.

Like John Maginnis and Jeff Crouere, Gill has made a career of lampooning Louisiana political figures. When he does go after public officials in other states or nations, he often compares them to public figures in Louisiana. Gill has a loyal readership in the circulation area of the Times-Picayune, his wit often (but not always) entertaining even those who disagree with him.

One of Gill's favorite topics in late 2008 and early 2009 was U.S. Representative Joseph Cao, who ousted indicted incumbent William J. Jefferson in Louisiana's 2nd congressional district—and related issues such as the New Orleans e-mail controversies and repercussions related to City Councilwoman Stacy Head.  In April 2009, Gill championed of the use of unstaffed cameras to photograph and ticket motorists who ignore red lights.

Gill has written three books, two of them on the New Orleans Mardi Gras. His Lords of Misrule: Mardi Gras and the Politics of Race in New Orleans was the first book to examine the role of Mardi Gras in New Orleans' political and social development as well as the first to analyze racial segregation in the krewes, which produce the annual parades.

References

American columnists
American satirists
British emigrants to the United States
Living people
Mardi Gras in New Orleans
Writers from New Orleans
Year of birth missing (living people)